Roger Federer defeated Andy Murray in the final, 6–3, 6–4, 7–6(13–11) to win the men's singles tennis title at the 2010 Australian Open. It was his fourth Australian Open title and 16th major title overall.

Rafael Nadal was the defending champion, but retired due to a right knee injury in the quarterfinals against Murray.

This event marked the last major appearance for former world No. 1, 1997 finalist and 1998 French Open champion Carlos Moyá.

Seeds

Qualifying

Draw

Finals

Top half

Section 1

Section 2

Section 3

Section 4

Bottom half

Section 5

Section 6

Section 7

Section 8

References

External links
 2010 Australian Open – Men's draws and results at the International Tennis Federation

Men's Singles
Australian Open (tennis) by year – Men's singles